Viliam Loviška (born 12 August 1964 in Bratislava, Czechoslovakia) is a Slovak sculptor, painter, designer, educator and organiser of the cultural life.

Study
He studied sculpture in the Studio of Juraj Gavula at the High School of the Art Industry in Bratislava in 1978–1982.

Further he continued his study at The Academy of Fine Arts and Design in Bratislava, Slovakia since 1982, where he studied in the Studio of Prof. Ladislav Snopek, Teodor Baník, and later in the Studio of Prof. Jan Kulich and Prof. Albín Brunovský.

Viliam graduated with the University master's degree "Academic Sculptor" in 1989.

Scholarships
1991–1992 – A scholarship granted by The Pollock-Krasner Foundation, USA
1993 – A scholarship granted by the Society of Graphic Artists, Slovakia
1996 – A scholarship granted by Milan Galanda Foundation, Slovakia

Works
Selection of the most important works:
Brasília, Passa Quatro, General M. R. Štefánik (sculpture)
USA, Washington, Gravestone of Stefan Osusky (artistic relief)
Slovakia, Bratislava, City Part of Ruzinov, Church of St. Vincent de Paul, Interior design (art furniture parts)
Slovakia, Bratislava, City Part of Ruzinov, Church of St. Vincent de Paul,  Pietà (sculpture)
Slovakia, Bratislava, City Part of Ruzinov,  Superior Chapel, Interior (cooperation with architect Ivan Jarina)
Slovakia, Nitra, Memorial to Unborn children (sculpture)
Slovakia, Stara Bystrica,  St. Michael Archangel (sculpture)
Slovakia, Stara Bystrica,  The Slovak Horologe, (cooperation with architect Ivan Jarina)
Slovakia, Bratislava, The Integration Hill (cooperation with architect Ivan Jarina)
Slovakia, Bratislava, BYZANT Gallery, Selection of smaller sculptures made from Levice Gold Onyx stone
Slovakia, Bratislava, Galvaniho Business Centrum IV, Design and furnishment of  exterior design components in the shape of 
Stará Bystrica, Unique, to the geographical location, Astronomical Clock 
 
Viliam Loviška has created many of his works in close cooperation with his wife Marcela Lovišková, also respected Slovak sculptor, designer and educator. Their daughter Lea Lovišková is a professional photographer and her artistic works are accompanying many of their common art exhibitions.

Activities
1990 – Founder of Visual Artists Association INAK (means DIFFERENTLY), founded as the reaction to the political and society changes  after Velvet Revolution
1996–2006 – Educator at the University of Constantine Philosopher in Nitra, Slovakia as the Head of Sculpture Studio
2004 – Founder of the Fine Arts and Design Studio BYZANT together with his wife Marcela
2007 – Founder of BYZANT Gallery in the Count Zichy Palace, Bratislava, Slovakia – 
Viliam Loviška exhibits his works in domestic and international exhibitions since 1989 (among others in Bratislava, Paris, Genève, Zagreb, Istanbul, Washington, New York, Vancouver, Vienna, Munich etc.).

References

General references
http://fara-ruzinov.sk/o-kostole

1964 births
Living people
Slovak artists